Dahlonega School No. 1 is an historic school building located near Ottumwa, Iowa, United States. It is located in the center of the unincorporated community of Dahlonega. The building was completed in 1921 and served as a school building until 1959. It served as a voting place for the township until 1986. The one-room schoolhouse measures .  The property was listed on the National Register of Historic Places in 2000.

References

School buildings completed in 1921
Buildings and structures in Wapello County, Iowa
Bungalow architecture in Iowa
American Craftsman architecture in Iowa
School buildings on the National Register of Historic Places in Iowa
National Register of Historic Places in Wapello County, Iowa
Defunct schools in Iowa
One-room schoolhouses in Iowa
1921 establishments in Iowa